Rosario Castellanos Figueroa (25 May 1925 – 7 August 1974) was a Mexican poet and author. She was one of Mexico's most important literary voices in the last century. Throughout her life, she wrote eloquently about issues of cultural and gender oppression, and her work has influenced Mexican feminist theory and cultural studies. Though she died young, she opened the door of Mexican literature to women, and left a legacy that still resonates today.

Life
Born in Mexico City, she was raised in Comitán near her family's ranch in the southern state of Chiapas. She was an introverted young girl, who took notice of the plight of the indigenous Maya who worked for her family. According to her own account, she felt estranged from her family after a soothsayer predicted that one of her mother's two children would die shortly, and her mother screamed out, "Not the boy!"

The family's fortunes changed suddenly when President Lázaro Cárdenas enacted a land reform and peasant emancipation policy that stripped the family of much of its land holdings. At fifteen, Castellanos and her parents moved to Mexico City. In 1948 both of her parents died in an accident, leaving her orphaned at 23 years of age.

Although she remained introverted, she joined a group of Mexican and Central American intellectuals, read extensively, and began to write. She studied philosophy and literature at UNAM (the National Autonomous University of Mexico), where she would later teach, and joined the National Indigenous Institute, writing scripts for puppet shows that were staged in impoverished regions to promote literacy. The Institute had been founded by President Cárdenas, who had taken away her family's land. She also wrote a weekly column for the newspaper Excélsior.

She married Ricardo Guerra Tejada, a professor of philosophy, in 1958. The birth in 1961 of their son Gabriel Guerra Castellanos (now a political scientist) was an important moment in Castellanos’ life; prior to his birth, she suffered from depression after several miscarriages. However, she and Guerra divorced after thirteen years of marriage, Guerra having been unfaithful to Castellanos. Her own personal life was marked by her difficult marriage and continuous depression, but she dedicated a large part of her work and energy to defending women's rights, for which she is remembered as a symbol of Latin American feminism.

In addition to her literary work, Castellanos held several government posts. In recognition for her contribution to Mexican literature, Castellanos was appointed ambassador to Israel in 1971.

On 7 August 1974, Castellanos died in Tel Aviv from an electrical accident. Some have speculated that the accident was in fact suicide. Mexican writer Martha Cerda, for example, wrote to journalist Lucina Kathmann, "I believe she committed suicide, though she already felt she was dead for some time.". There is no evidence to support such a claim, however.

Work and influences

Throughout her career, Castellanos wrote poetry, essays, one major play, and three novels: the semi-autobiographical Balún-Canán (translated into English as The Nine Guardians), Oficio de tinieblas (translated into English as The Book of Lamentations), and Rito de iniciación. Oficio de tinieblas depicts a Tzotzil indigenous uprising in Chiapas, based on one that had occurred in the 19th century. Rito de iniciación is a bildungsroman about a young woman who discovers her vocation of a writer.  Despite being a ladino – of mestizo, not indigenous descent – Castellanos in her works shows considerable concern and understanding for the plight of indigenous peoples.

"Cartas a Ricardo," a collection of Castellanos's letters to her husband, Ricardo Guerra, was published after her death, as was her third novel, Rito de iniciación. In "Cartas a Ricardo" there are some 28 letters Castellanos wrote from Spain (1950–51) where she travelled with her friend, the poet, Dolores Castro.

Ciudad Real is a collection of short stories published in 1960. Castellanos’ main focus in these short stories are the differences between distinct groups, namely, the whites and the indigenous people, but she also addresses the differences between men and women. Communication is an important theme in Castellanos’ work, and Ciudad Real shows the tension between the native people of Chiapas, Mexico and the whites, who cannot communicate with each other and subsequently don't trust each other because they don't speak the same language. These are recurring themes in this collection, along with themes of lonely and marginalized people. However, the last story of the novel is somewhat different than the rest. In this story the main character, named Arthur, knows both Spanish and the indigenous language and is therefore able to break down the barriers that stand between the two different groups throughout the novel. At the end, Arthur makes a connection with nature (something that is rare in Castellanos’ work) and finds peace with himself and with the world. It is the only story within the novel with a “happy ending”.

Castellanos admired writers such as Gabriela Mistral, Emily Dickinson, Simone de Beauvoir, Virginia Woolf, and Simone Weil. Castellanos' poem, "Valium 10," is in the confessional mode, and is a great feminist poem comparable to Sylvia Plath's "Daddy."

Awards and honours 
In 1958, she received the Chiapas Award, for Balún Canán, and two years after the Xavier Villaurrutia Award, for Ciudad Real. Among other subsequent awards, the Sor Juana Inés de la Cruz Award (1962), the Carlos Trouyet Award of Letters (1967), and the Elías Sourasky Award of Letters (1972).

In addition, several public places bear her name:

 A park and a public library are named after her, both in the A park in Mexico City, located in the borough (Delegación) Cuajimalpa de Morelos in Mexico City.
 The library of the Center for Research and Gender Studies, of the UNAM.
 One of the gardens of the Faculty of Philosophy and Letters, of the UNAM.
 The headquarters of the Economic Culture Fund in Colonia Condesa, Mexico City, bears her name.

Selected bibliography
Balún-Canán Fondo de Cultura Economica, 1957; 2007,  
Poemas (1953–1955), Colección Metáfora, 1957
Ciudad Real: Cuentos, 1960; Penguin Random House Grupo Editorial México, 2007,  
Oficio de tinieblas 1962; 2013, Grupo Planeta – México, 
Álbum de familia (1971)
Poesía no eres tú; Obra poética: 1948–1971 1972; Fondo de Cultura Economica, 2004,  
Mujer que sabe latín . . . 1973; Fondo de Cultura Economica, 2003,  
El eterno femenino: Farsa 1973; Fondo de Cultura Economica, 2012,  
Bella dama sin piedad y otros poemas, Fondo de Cultura Económica, 1984, 

Declaración de fe Penguin Random House Grupo Editorial México, 2012,  
La muerte del tigre SEP, 198?
Cartas a Ricardo (1994)
Rito de iniciación 1996; 2012, Penguin Random House Grupo Editorial México,

English translations 
The Nine Guardians: a Novel, Translator Irene Nicholson, Readers International, 1992,  
 (Oficio de tinieblas)

City of Kings, Translated by Robert S. Rudder, Gloria Chacón de Arjona, Latin American Literary Review Press, 1993, 
 The selected poems of Rosario Castellanos, translator Magda Bogin, Saint Paul, Minn.: Graywolf Press, 1988.

References

Further reading
Ahern, Maureen. Rosario Castellanos. Latin American Writers. 3 vols. Ed. Solé/Abreu. NY: Charles Scribner's Sons, 1989, III: 1295–1302.
___. "Rosario Castellanos". Spanish American Woman Writers: A Bio-Bibliographical Source Book. Ed. Diane E. Marting. Westport/London: Greenwood Press, 1990: 140–155.
Anderson, Helene M. "Rosario Castellanos and the Structures of Power". Contemporary Women Authors of Latin America. Ed. Doris Meyer & Margarite Fernández Olmos. NY: Brooklyn College Humanities Institute Series, Brooklyn College, 1983: 22–31.
Bellm, Dan. "A Woman Who Knew Latin." The Nation. (26 June 1989): 891–893.
Brushwood, John S. The Spanish American Novel: A Twentieth Century Survey. Austin, TX: University of Texas Press, 1975., pp. 237–238.
Castillo, Debra A. Talking Back: Toward a Latin American Feminist Literary Criticism. Ithaca: Cornell University Press, 1992.
Juárez Torres, Francisco. La poesia indigenista en cuatro poetas latinoamericanos: Manuel González Prada, Gabriela Mistral, Pablo Neruda y Rosario Castellanos. Ann Arbor: UMI, 1990.
Kintz, Linda. Title: The Subject's Tragedy: Political Poetics, Feminist Theory, and Drama. Ann Arbor : University of Michigan Press, 1992.
Laín Corona, Guillermo. "Infancia y opresión en Balún Canán, de Rosario Castellanos. La niña como eje temático y estructural de la novela". Bulletin of Hispanic Studies, 88.7 (2011): 777–794.
Medeiros-Lichem, María Teresa. "Rosario Castellanos: The Inclusion of Plural Languages and the Problematic of Class and Race in Texts Written by Women". In Reading the Feminine Voice in Latin American Women's Fiction: From Teresa de la Parra to Elena Poniatowska and Luisa Valenzuela. New York/Bern: Peter Lang, 2002: 84–99.
Melendez, Priscilla. "Genealogia y escritura en Balún-Canán de Rosario Castellanos" MLN 113.2 (March 1998) (Hispanic Issue): 339–363.
Meyer, Doris. Reinterpreting the Spanish American Essay: Women Writers of the 19th and 20th Centuries. Austin : University of Texas Press, 1995.
Schaefer, Claudia. Textured Lives: Women, Art, and Representation in Modern Mexico. Tucson: University of Arizona Press, 1992.
Schwartz, Kessel. A New History of Spanish American Fiction. Vol. 2. Coralal Gables: University of Florida Press, 1971: 299–301.
Turner, Harriet S. "Moving Selves: The Alchemy of Esmero (Gabriela Mistral, Gloria Riestra, Rosario Castellanos, and Gloria Fuertes)". In the Feminine Mode: Essays on Hispanic Women Writers. Eds, Noël Valis and Carol Maier. Lewisburg: Bucknell University press, 1990: 227–245.
Ward, Thomas. La resistencia cultural: la nación en el ensayo de las Américas. Lima: Universidad Ricardo Palma, 2004: 269–275.

External links

 
Rosario Castellanos reading some of her poetry: Rosario Castellanos at www.palabravirtual.com
Musical versions of Rosario Castellanos' poetry: 
Rosario Castellanos park.

1925 births
1974 deaths
Accidental deaths by electrocution
Mexican women poets
20th-century Mexican poets
National Autonomous University of Mexico alumni
Writers from Mexico City
Accidental deaths in Israel
Ambassadors of Mexico to Israel
Mexican feminists
Mestizo writers
Mexican feminist writers
20th-century Mexican women writers
Mexican women ambassadors
People from Comitán